Negishi Station (根岸駅) is the name of two train stations in Japan:

 Negishi Station (Kanagawa)
 Negishi Station (Fukushima)